Lawrence Lavon Linville (September 29, 1939 – April 10, 2000) was an American actor known for his portrayal of the surgeon Major Frank Burns on the television series M*A*S*H.

Early life and education
Linville was born in Ojai, California, the son of Fay Pauline (née Kennedy) and Harry Lavon Linville. Raised in Sacramento, he attended El Camino High School (class of 1957) and later studied aeronautical engineering at the University of Colorado at Boulder before applying for a scholarship to the Royal Academy of Dramatic Arts in London.

Career
After returning to the United States, Linville began his acting career at the Barter Theatre in Abingdon, Virginia, a year-round repertory theater under director Robert Porterfield.

Early career
Before his five-year co-starring role on M*A*S*H, Linville had guest-starring roles on many of the well-known television series of the late 1960s and early 1970s. Included in his credits in that period are one appearance each on Bonanza, Room 222 and Adam-12. He had three appearances, as three different characters, on Mission: Impossible over three seasons of that television series. On the early seasons of Mannix, Linville had a recurring role as Lieutenant George Kramer, an ally of Mannix in the L.A. Police Department.

Linville played the coroner on the television movie The Night Stalker (1972), a predecessor of the Kolchak television series, and in the episode titled "Chopper" of Kolchak: The Night Stalker, he played the youngest police captain on the force investigating murders committed by a headless motorbike rider. He also had a small role in the film Kotch (1971), which was directed by Jack Lemmon and starred Walter Matthau. Linville also appeared as U.S. Treasury Agent Hugh Emery in the 1972 television series Search episode "One of Our Probes is Missing".

M*A*S*H

When the television series M*A*S*H was picked up for production in early-1972, Linville signed a five-year contract for the role of Major Frank Burns, an ill-tempered, inept civilian surgeon who embraced military discipline with a cartoonish over-zealousness.   This contrasted with the more competent and rebellious doctors played by Alan Alda and Wayne Rogers (and later, Mike Farrell). During the second season, the sitcom's tone started to change from pure comedy to more drama-focused story lines, as it reflected issues related to the Vietnam War (though M*A*S*H was set during the Korean War, it aired during the Vietnam and post-Vietnam era and tended to reflect this period in a roundabout fashion). At the start of the series fifth season in late-1976, Linville was offered a renewal for two more seasons, but declined.  As the tone of the series had evolved to more serious storylines, Linville felt that he had taken the Frank Burns character, which had become increasingly one-dimensional, as far as he could, and chose to leave the series to pursue other roles.

Later career
After M*A*S*H, Linville starred or appeared in many films and television series. He was a guest-star on many television series, most frequently Murder, She Wrote, Fantasy Island, The Love Boat, The FBI Story, and CHiPs. He also appeared on episodes of Airwolf (he played Maxwell in "And a Child Shall Lead") and The Rockford Files, and appeared in the television movie The Girl, the Gold Watch & Dynamite (1981). He also played a stock character—the "Crazy General"—along with Edward Winter in the pilot episode of Misfits of Science. He also co-starred in the short-lived sitcom Grandpa Goes to Washington with Jack Albertson.

Linville appeared as jealous ex-boyfriend Randy Bigelow in the short-lived 1982 Disney series Herbie, the Love Bug. He also starred in the short-lived The Jeffersons spinoff Checking In, where he played Florence Johnston's (Marla Gibbs) nemesis, Lyle Block; however, this series only lasted four episodes. In 1984, Linville co-starred on Paper Dolls, a nighttime drama on ABC offering a glimpse behind-the-scenes of the fashion industry. In 1991, Linville appeared on an episode of the television series Night Court as a doctor. Linville also appeared in an episode of Lois & Clark: The New Adventures of Superman season 1 episode 3 as a crackpot claiming to have been abducted by Superman and taken aboard his spaceship.

He also had roles in many films, including School Spirit (1985), Earth Girls Are Easy (1988), C.H.U.D. II: Bud the C.H.U.D. (1989), Rock 'n' Roll High School Forever (1991), A Million to Juan (1994), No Dessert, Dad, till You Mow the Lawn (1994), and Fatal Pursuit (1995).

Linville appeared as an interview subject for Memories of M*A*S*H, a 1991 special commemorating the 20th anniversary of the series. In 1997, he joined Larry Gelbart (the producer and creator of M*A*S*H) and David Ogden Stiers (who played Frank Burns' replacement on the sitcom, Major Charles Winchester) to attend a deactivation ceremony for the last remaining U.S. MASH unit in Korea.

Marriage and family
He was married five times: to Kate Geer (daughter of actor Will Geer and sister of actress Ellen Geer), with whom he had a daughter, Kelly Linville (born 1970) before they divorced. Kelly was his only child. He also married (and divorced) Vana Tribbey, Melissa Gallant, and Susan Hagan. His last marriage was to Deborah Guydon, who was by his side when he died.

Surgery, illness, and death
After doctors found a malignant tumor under his sternum, Linville underwent surgery in February 1998 to remove part of his lung. He received further treatment, but had continuing health problems over the next two years. Linville died of pneumonia in New York City on April 10, 2000, after complications from cancer surgery. His ashes were scattered at sea off the coast of Bodega Bay, California.

Filmography

Film

Television

References

External links

1939 births
2000 deaths
20th-century American male actors
Alumni of RADA
American male film actors
American male television actors
Deaths from lung cancer in New York (state)
Deaths from pneumonia in New York City
Male actors from Greater Los Angeles
Male actors from Sacramento, California
People from Ojai, California
University of Colorado Boulder alumni